Ignacio Ávila Rodríguez (born 19 January 1979) is a Paralympian athlete and cyclist from Spain competing mainly in category T12 middle-distance events in athletics, and in track time trial, track pursuit, road time trial and road race.

Personal 

He is from the Catalan region of Spain.

Athletics 
He medalled at the 2009 IBSA European Championships in Greece. He competed at the 2011 World Championships in Christchurch, New Zealand where he won a medal. Competing at the Brazil hosted IBSA World Games, he earned a medal. From the Catalan region of Spain, he was a recipient of a 2012 Plan ADO scholarship.

Paralympics 
He competed in the 2000 Summer Paralympics in Sydney, Australia. There he won a silver medal in the men's 4 x 400 metre relay — T13 event, went out in the first round of the men's 200 metres — T12 event and finished fourth in the men's 400 metres — T12 event. He also competed at the 2004 Summer Paralympics in Athens, Greece. There he won a gold medal in the men's 800 metres — T12 event, finished fourth in the men's 400 metres — T12 event and finished sixth in the men's 1500 metres — T13 event.  He also competed at the 2008 Summer Paralympics in Beijing, China. There he won a bronze medal in the men's 1500 metres — T13 event and finished fourth in the men's 800 metres — T12 event.

Cycling

Paralympics 
He competed with him guide Joan Font in the 2016 Summer Paralympics in Rio de Janeiro, Brazil. There he won a silver medal in the men's road race — B event. He also competed in track time trial, finishing 7th, and in 4000 m individual pursuit, where he classified for the bronze medal contest, losing against the Dutch Stephen de Vries.

Notes

References

External links 
 
 

1979 births
Living people
Spanish male middle-distance runners
Spanish disability athletes
Paralympic athletes of Spain
Paralympic gold medalists for Spain
Paralympic silver medalists for Spain
Paralympic bronze medalists for Spain
Paralympic athletes with a vision impairment
Athletes (track and field) at the 2000 Summer Paralympics
Athletes (track and field) at the 2004 Summer Paralympics
Athletes (track and field) at the 2008 Summer Paralympics
Athletes (track and field) at the 2012 Summer Paralympics
Medalists at the 2000 Summer Paralympics
Medalists at the 2004 Summer Paralympics
Medalists at the 2008 Summer Paralympics
Plan ADOP alumni
Medalists at the 2016 Summer Paralympics
Medalists at the World Para Athletics European Championships
Paralympic medalists in athletics (track and field)
Paralympic medalists in cycling
Paralympic cyclists of Spain
Visually impaired middle-distance runners
Paralympic middle-distance runners
21st-century Spanish people
Spanish blind people